Uniyala is a genus of flowering plants belonging to the family Asteraceae.

Its native range is India and Sri Lanka.

Species:
 Uniyala anceps (C.B.Clarke ex Hook.f.) H.Rob. & Skvarla 
 Uniyala bourdillonii (Gamble) H.Rob. & Skvarla

References

Asteraceae
Asteraceae genera